Ibex Valley is a hamlet in Canada's Yukon. The hamlet is considered a local advisory area with an advisory council providing local government. Its population in 2001 according to the Canada 2001 Census was 315.

Geography
Ibex Valley comprises residential areas along the Alaska Highway immediately outside the Whitehorse city limits as far as approximately historical mile 945, as well as a small number of sideroads, including a five-mile loop of the original Alaska Highway alignment from Mile 929 to 934. The hamlet is part of the Whitehorse Census Agglomeration.

Demographics 

Seventy percent of Ibex Valley's population is non-aboriginal.

Economy 
While most residents work in Whitehorse, some residents are engaged in agriculture or wilderness tourism activities.

Infrastructure 
Ibex Valley has a volunteer fire department.

See also 
 Ibex Valley
 Ibex Mountain

References

External links

http://ca.epodunk.com/profiles/yukon-territory/ibex-valley/2001034.html 

Hamlets in Yukon